The Best Olympian, Men's Sports ESPY Award formerly known as the Best U.S. Male Olympian ESPY Award has been presented annually since 2009 to the sportsman or team affiliated with the United States Olympic Committee and contesting sport internationally adjudged to be the best.  The award serves in practice to replace the Best Male Olympic Performance ESPY Award, which was presented in 2005, and the Best U.S. Olympian ESPY Award presented in 2006.

Balloting for the award is undertaken by fans over the Internet from amongst between three and five choices selected by the ESPN Select Nominating Committee, and the award is conferred in June to reflect performance and achievement over the twelve months previous.

List of winners

See also
USOC Team of the Year Award
United States at the Olympics
United States Olympic Hall of Fame
Best U.S. Female Olympian ESPY Award

References

ESPY Awards
American sports trophies and awards
United States at the Olympics